Ashton may refer to:

Names
Ashton (given name)
Ashton (surname)

Places

Australia
 Ashton, Elizabeth Bay, a heritage-listed house in Sydney, New South Wales
Ashton, South Australia

Canada
Ashton, Ontario

New Zealand
Ashton, New Zealand

South Africa
Ashton, Western Cape

United Kingdom

England
Ashton, Cambridgeshire
Ashton, Cornwall
Ashton, Devon
Ashton, Hampshire
Ashton, Herefordshire
Ashton, North Northamptonshire, near Oundle
Ashton, West Northamptonshire, near Northampton
Ashton, Somerset, a hamlet in the parish of Chapel Allerton, Sedgemoor district
Long Ashton or Ashton, North Somerset
Ashton Court
Ashton Gate, Bristol
Ashton Vale, now in Bristol
Bower Ashton, now in Bristol
Ashton Common, Wiltshire
Ashton Green, East Sussex
Ashton Hayes, Cheshire 
Ashton Keynes, Wiltshire 
Ashton under Hill, Worcestershire
Ashton upon Mersey, Greater Manchester
Ashton-in-Makerfield, Greater Manchester in the Metropolitan Borough of Wigan
Ashton (ward), an electoral ward in Wigan
Ashton-on-Ribble, Lancashire
Ashton-under-Lyne, Greater Manchester
Ashton Canal

Scotland
Ashton, Inverclyde
Ashton Lane, Glasgow

United States
Ashton, Georgia
Ashton, Idaho
Ashton, Illinois
Ashton, Iowa
Ashton, Kansas
Ashton, Maryland
Ashton, Michigan
Ashton, Minnesota
Ashton, Missouri
Ashton, Nebraska
Ashton, South Dakota
Ashton, West Virginia
Ashton, Wisconsin
Ashton Corners, Wisconsin

Other uses
 Ashton Middle School, formerly Dunstable Grammar School, Dunstable
 Avro Ashton, a 1950s British experimental jet airliner
 Ashton Builders, a former UK home builder
 Ashton Music, a brand of mainly entry-level musical instruments and related equipment
 Ashton Cricket Club, Ashton-under-Lyne
 Ashton Sixth Form College, Ashton-under-Lyne
 Ashton United F.C., Ashton-under-Lyne
 Ashton Observatory, an observatory within Ashton-Wildwood Park in Jasper County, Iowa
 Ashton (cigar), a brand of cigar established in 1985, manufactured by Arturo Fuente
 Ashton (horse)
 The Ashton, a residential skyscraper in Austin, Texas, U.S.

See also
 Ashton-Tate, a software company
 Chez Ashton, a fast food restaurant chain in Quebec City, Quebec, Canada
 Ashton Gate (disambiguation)